Quien Sabe Glacier is a glacier located on the west slopes of Boston Peak, North Cascades National Park in the U.S. state of Washington. Quien Sabe Glacier retreated 1200 meters from its Little Ice Age maximum in approximately 1850 to 1950. The glacier then advanced 55 meters between 1955 and 1975. It then started to retreat again and has retreated 200 meters from its largest extent in the 1970s to 2010. The glacier is separated by ridges from Sahale Glacier to the south and the much larger Boston Glacier to the north.

See also
List of glaciers in the United States

References

Glaciers of the North Cascades
Glaciers of Skagit County, Washington
Glaciers of Washington (state)